Jennie Keith is an American anthropologist. She specializes in researching aging, and was the Centennial Professor of Anthropology, an endowed chair, at Swarthmore College.

Early life
Keith graduated from Pomona College in 1964 and received her doctorate from the University of Chicago in 1968.

References

American anthropologists
Swarthmore College faculty
Pomona College alumni
University of Chicago alumni
Year of birth missing (living people)
Living people
Place of birth missing (living people)
American women anthropologists
American women academics
21st-century American women